Abay District is a district of Karaganda Region in central Kazakhstan. The administrative center of the district is the town of Abay. Population:

History
Formed March 21 1973 and under the name Michurinsky District with the administrative center in settlement Topar. In 1997 it was renamed into Abaysky, the administrative center was moved to the city of Abay.

Population
The population is 58,673 (2019)

National composition (at the beginning of 2019):
 Russians - 23,587 people (40.20%)
 Kazakhs - 23,195 people (39.53%)
 Ukrainians - 3168 people (5.40%)
 Tatars - 2155 people (3.67%)
 Germans - 1981 people (3.38%)
 Belarusians - 1047 people (1.78%)
 Bashkirs - 471 people. (0.80%)
 Chechens - 424 people (0.72%)
 Azerbaijanis - 442 people (0.75%)
 Koreans - 293 people (0.50%)
 Poles - 199 people (0.34%)
 Chuvash people - 121 people (0.21%)
 Lithuanians - 159 people (0.27%)
 Moldovans - 157 people (0.27%)
 Uzbeks - 228 people (0.39%)
 Mordva - 100 people (0.17%)
 Greeks - 23 people (0.40%)
 others - 923 people (1.57%)
 Total — 58,673 people (100.00%)

References

Districts of Kazakhstan
Karaganda Region